Look into the Future is the second studio album by Journey. It was released in January 1976 by Columbia Records.

For their second album, the members of Journey toned down the overt progressiveness of their first, self-titled release, in favor of a more focused approach. Despite that, Look into the Future still retains some of the experimental approach and sound of the debut, especially in the title track and "I'm Gonna Leave You". The album also features a cover version of The Beatles' "It's All Too Much" from the 1968 Yellow Submarine film and 1969 soundtrack. The title track was the longest recorded Journey song until 1980, when "Destiny" from Dream, After Dream would claim that honor.

Rhythm guitarist George Tickner left the band after having co-written two songs for this album, leaving members Gregg Rolie (keyboards/lead vocals), Neal Schon (guitar), Ross Valory (bass) and Aynsley Dunbar (drums).

Track listing

Personnel
Journey
 Gregg Rolie – keyboards, vocals
 Neal Schon – guitar
 Ross Valory – bass guitar
 Aynsley Dunbar – drums

Production
 Glen Kolotkin – co-producer, engineer
 Mark Friedman – engineer
 George Horn – mastering
 Rick Narin – artwork
 Ethan Russell – photography

Charts

References

External links 
 Journey - Look into the Future (1976) album releases & credits at Discogs.com
 Journey - Look into the Future (1976) album to be listened as stream at Play.Spotify.com

Journey (band) albums
1976 albums
Columbia Records albums
Albums produced by Glen Kolotkin